The Zimbabwe national cricket team toured South Africa from 16 February to 13 March 2005 for a three-match One Day International series and two Test matches. South Africa won all five matches by significant margins.

ODI series

1st ODI

2nd ODI

3rd ODI

Test series

1st Test

2nd Test

Tour matches

List A: Combined Gauteng–North West XI vs Zimbabweans

First-class: Combined Easterns–Northerns XI vs Zimbabweans

External links
Series home at ESPNcricinfo

2004–05 South African cricket season
2005 in South African cricket
2005 in Zimbabwean cricket
2004-05